Operation Keystone Cardinal was the withdrawal of the 3rd Marine Division from South Vietnam, taking place from 30 September to 27 November 1969.

Background
Following the withdrawal of the 9th Marine Regiment from South Vietnam in Operation Keystone Eagle, planning began for the withdrawal of the remaining units of 3rd Marine Division in line with the plans prepared by MACV.

Operation

The Keystone Cardinal redeployments took place as follows:

Aftermath
Operation Keystone Cardinal concluded on 27 November 1969.

References

Keystone Cardinal
United States Marine Corps in the Vietnam War
Battles and operations of the Vietnam War in 1969